Emil Michael Nässling (1 October 1864 – 20 May 1924) was a Finnish sports shooter, who competed at the 1908 Summer Olympics, and won one Finnish national championship gold.

Shooting

Olympics

International 

Nässling competed at the 1914 ISSF World Shooting Championships.

National 

He won Finnish national championship gold in free rifle, three positions, in 1911.

Other 

He was among the best cyclists in Finland in the 1890s.

His family name has also appeared as Näsling. Olympic shooter Frans Nässling was his brother.

Sources

References

External links
 

1864 births
1924 deaths
Finnish male sport shooters
Olympic shooters of Finland
Shooters at the 1908 Summer Olympics
Sportspeople from Turku